"Walk It Out " is a song by American singer Jennifer Hudson. It was written by Lyrica Anderson, Jacob Luttrell, Chris Godbey, Mike Tompkins, Jim Beanz, J-Roc, Hudson and Timbaland for her third studio album JHUD (2014), while production was handled by the latter. The mid-tempo track was released worldwide on April 29, 2014 as the second single from the album.

Music video
The music video for "Walk It Out" was released on June 16, 2014. Shot in Chicago, it was directed by Little X and follows Hudson through the streets of Chicago. Timbaland and Hudson's partner David Otunga both make cameo appearances in the video.

Track listings

Credits and personnel 
Credits adapted from the liner notes of JHUD.

 Lyrica Anderson – writer
 Matt Bang – recording
 Jim Beanz – vocal production, writer
 Jacob Luttrell – writer
 Chris Godbey – mixing, recording, writer

 Jerome Harmon – producer, writer
 Jennifer Hudson – vocals, writer
 Rob Suchecki – recording assistant
 Timbaland – producer, vocals, writer
 Mike Tompkins  – additional vocals, writer

Charts

References

External links
 

2014 singles
2014 songs
Jennifer Hudson songs
Music videos directed by Director X
Song recordings produced by Timbaland
Songs written by Timbaland
Timbaland songs
Songs written by Jerome "J-Roc" Harmon
Songs written by Lyrica Anderson
Songs written by Jim Beanz
RCA Records singles
Songs written by Jacob Luttrell